Ko 2 ( King 2) is a 2016 Indian political thriller film co-written and directed by Sarath, who earlier worked as associate director/screenplay writer for films like Unnaipol Oruvan and Billa II. The film is produced by Elred Kumar and stars Bobby Simha and Nikki Galrani, while Prakash Raj reprises his role from the first film. Bala Saravanan, Ilavarasu, and John Vijay play supporting roles. The music was composed by Leon James with editing by Richard Kevin.

This film is a remake of the 2014 Telugu film Prathinidhi, starring Nara Rohit. A stand-alone sequel to the successful 2011 film Ko, the film was planned to release in April 2016 but released on 13 May 2016.

Plot
A common man named Kumaran (Bobby Simha) kidnaps the Chief Minister of Tamil Nadu, Yogeeswaran (Prakash Raj), at a private old age home event in Chennai. The news goes viral, and everyone from the local to the central cabinet starts taking the issue personally. Home Minister Thillainayagam (Ilavarasu) appoints Santhanapandian (John Vijay), the Police Commissioner of Tirunelveli, to rescue Yogeeswaran. Santhanapandian questions Bala (Bala Saravanan), a minister's son who was discovered unconscious at the scene of the kidnapping. Bala tells that he and Kumaran had become friends when Kumaran had saved him from a group of thugs, but they are shocked to see that they both of them love the same girl - Priyadharshini (Nikki Galrani). Bala also reveals that Kumaran willingly allowed him to pursue his relationship with Priyadharshini in exchange for making arrangements for Yogeeswaran to attend the old age home event.

Meanwhile, as Santhanapandian and his deputy, ACP Arivazhagan (Bharath Reddy), strive to get clues about Kumaran, Kumaran explains to Yogeeswaran his motive for kidnapping him. Kumaran was an orphan, but due to the efforts of an honest politician named Kumaraswamy (Nassar), who had sponsored him, he got a good education and became a journalist with the News7 TV channel. When he went to Kumaraswamy's house to thank him for his contribution to his life, he found out that Kumaraswamy had gone missing for many days. On further investigation, he learned that Kumaraswamy had been buried alive by Thillainayagam and his sons Kishore (Shan) and Prathap. Thillainayagam had contested against Kumaraswamy in the last election and had defeated him by rigging the vote, which forced Kumaraswamy to file a case against him and demand a recount. When Kumaraswamy refused to withdraw the case against him, Thillainayagam and his sons buried him alive. Kumaran then filed a case against Thillainayagam and asked Kumaraswamy's intellectually disabled son, also named Kumaran (Karunakaran), who was unaware that his father had been killed, to give the statement to the police inspector. However, the police inspector was Thillainayagam's aide and informed him about Kumaran. Thillainayagam's sons then took Kumaran on a bus and pushed him out en route. He was then run over by a lorry and died.

In order to avenge the deaths of Kumaraswamy and his son, Kumaran hatched a plan with Priyadharshini and Bala to kidnap Yogeeswaran in order to expose Thillainayagam slowly through false media reports based on false replies by Bala while being interrogated by the police. In the process, Thillainayagam's sons are taken into questioning. After being tortured, they eventually give in and expose Thillainayagam as Kumaraswamy's murderer, even giving them the location in Thillainayagam's lawn where Kumaraswamy was buried. Thillainayagam is arrested, and Kumaran releases Yogeeswaran. Kumaran also escapes from his hideout and poses as a journalist, while Yogeeswaran says that he cannot identify the kidnapper. Even Santhanapandian gives up on pursuing the kidnapper as the latter had kidnapped Yogeeswaran with good intentions.

Cast

 Bobby Simha as Kumaran, a man who kidnaps Yogeeswaran in order to expose Thillainayagam
 Prakash Raj as Chief Minister Yogeeswaran, who gets kidnapped by Kumaran while attending an old age home event
 Nikki Galrani as Priyadharshini, a woman whom both Kumaran and Bala love but whom Kumaran sacrifices his love for
 Bala Saravanan as Bala, Kumaran's friend who helps him kidnap Yogeeswaran
 Ilavarasu as Home Minister Thillainayagam, the antagonist who wins an election unfairly and kills Kumaraswamy
 John Vijay as Police Commissioner Santhanapandian, a man appointed by Thillainayagam to rescue Yogeeswaran
 Nassar as Kumaraswamy, an honest politician who sponsors Kumaran but gets killed in the hands of Thillainayagam and his sons
 Karunakaran as Kumaran, Kumaraswamy's son who did not know about his father's death but dies after getting run over by a lorry
 Bharath Reddy as ACP Arivazhagan, Santhanapandian's deputy
 Shan as Kishore, Thillainayagam's son
 Reshma Pasupuleti as Shobana, a newsreader and Priyadharshini's friend who helps in exposing Thillainayagam
 Mayilsamy as Yogeeswaran's party volunteer
 Crane Manohar as Yogeeswaran's party volunteer
 Gowtham
 Ravi Venkatraman

Production
Following the success of Ko (2011) directed by K. V. Anand, the producers had floated the idea of a potential sequel with pre-production work beginning on a follow-up film featuring co-producer James in the lead role. The film, however, failed to take off and in April 2015, Elred Kumar announced that he would be producing Ko 2 and that the new venture would be made by an entirely different team. New actors and technicians were added to the team to replace those involved in the original, with Sarath announced as the director. Bobby Simha and Nikki Galrani were revealed to be the lead actors, while it was announced that Prakash Raj would play the role of a Chief Minister. Leon James, who made his debut with Kanchana 2, was signed on to compose the film's score and soundtrack.

In June 2015, the team released a motion poster and announced that the film was 50% complete.

Music

The film's score and soundtrack was composed by Leon James, in his first solo venture after previously working on two songs on Kanchana 2 alongside three other composers.All songs were written by Na.Muthukumar. The song "Unnai Matrinal" was released as a single track song as a tribute to ex-president A. P. J. Abdul Kalam, it was released on 14 August 2015. The album was released on 1 October 2015, but a promo for each song was released a week before. "Kohila" promo was released 22 September 2015, "Kannama" promo was released on 23 September 2015, and "Vidaadha" was released on 24 September 2015. Behindwoods rated the album 3 out of 5 and said, "The album stays true to the film’s theme and also vouches for novel experimentation and musical feast!". The audio rights are secured by Sony Music.

References

External links

2016 films
Indian sequel films
2010s Tamil-language films
Indian political thriller films
Tamil remakes of Telugu films
2016 directorial debut films